Dajka is a Hungarian surname. Notable people with the surname include:

Bettina Dajka (born 1990), Hungarian handballer
Jobie Dajka (1981–2009), Australian track cyclist
László Dajka (born 1959), Hungarian footballer
Margit Dajka (1907–1986), Hungarian actress

Hungarian-language surnames